Anastrangalia renardi is a species of beetle from family Cerambycidae, that is endemic to Mongolia.

References

Lepturinae
Beetles described in 1848
Endemic fauna of Mongolia